Ohad Tal  is an Israeli politician who serves as a member of Knesset for the Religious Zionist Party following the 2022 Israeli legislative election. He was the director of World Bnei Akiva until he was forced to resign.

Political career
Tal was elected to the Knesset as part of the joint Religious Zionist Party-Otzma Yehudit list in the 2022 Israeli legislative election.

References

Personal Life 
Tal is married to Tamar. They live in Efrat with their four children.

Living people
Members of the 25th Knesset (2022–)
Religious Zionist Party politicians
Year of birth missing (living people)